Something Happens are an Irish pop-rock band whose heyday was the late 1980s and early 1990s. The band's lineup consists of Tom Dunne (Vocals), Ray Harman (Guitar), Alan Byrne (Bass) and Eamonn Ryan (Drums).

An earlier incarnation of the band was called 'The Dazzmen' and was fronted by singer Martin Lynch who left the band and became the frontman for another early 1980s Dublin band 'The Cracker Factory'. After Lynch's departure the band recruited vocalist Tom Dunne and became 'Something Happens'. They shot to prominence with the single "Burn Clear" which was featured on the soundtrack of the 1988 Irish film The Courier.



Career

The Dublin-based band's first release was the self-released "Two Chances" EP. After signing to Virgin Records they released a live EP, I Know Ray Harman, in 1988 which was recorded live at McGonagles. Their live show was energetic while the bands dress varied from Tom Dunne's trademark paisley shirts to Alan Byrne's neckties. Later that year, their debut album Been There, Seen That, Done That was released on Virgin Records. In August 1989 the band supported Simple Minds at their Dublin. One of the singles from their first album, "Forget Georgia," was later covered by Canadian singer Emm Gryner on her 2005 album Songs of Love and Death. 'Burn Clear' another track was on the soundtrack of the Irish film "The Courier"

Their second album, 1990's Stuck Together With God’s Glue was recorded in Los Angeles, and contains their best known songs, "Parachute" and "Hello, Hello, Hello, Hello, Hello (Petrol)". The album received critical acclaim, with Petrol included in the year-end top fifty singles list of rock magazine N.M.E. The band also received publicity in the music press and on television. Although popular band in Ireland, international success eluded them and they were dropped by Virgin. This led to T-shirts bearing the legend "Something Happens are no longer Virgins." The year 1992 saw the release of Bedlam-A-Go-Go on Charisma Records. The record label folded, and their final album, 1994's Planet Fabulous, was released on the Wild Bikini label. The following year, a greatest hits album The beatings will continue until morale improves was released. In 2004, this album was re-released with the title of The Best of Something Happens.

The Something Happens track, 'Momentary Thing' appeared on Veronica Mars: Original Television Soundtrack, released by Nettwerk Records.

The band disbanded in the late 1990s.

The Band today

Today, the band play occasional gigs, but they no longer record new material in the studio. The band always play at the famous Whelan's venue in Dublin twice a year, once at Christmas and a second time during the early Summer. They also make appearances at various other festivals around the country, such as their 2017 appearance at the Bulmers Live at Leopardstown Series, their 2016 appearance at the Skerries Soundwaves Festival, and their 2016 show as part of the Wexford Spiegeltent Festival. In December 2009, Something Happens supported Horslips as part of their comeback show at the 3Arena in Dublin. For these gigs, they sometimes wear t-shirts that say "Something Happens - Irish Tour (S.H.I.T)".

The band have appeared on RTÉ's The Late Late Show on a number of occasions in recent years, they performed their hit 'Parachute' on the show in March 2006, and again in April 2014 to celebrate their 30th anniversary.

Discography

 Been There, Seen That, Done That (1988)
  I Know Ray Harman (1988) - live album recorded at McGonagles in Dublin 
 Stuck Together With God's Glue (1990)	
 Live at the Town & Country  	
 Bedlam A Go-Go (1992)
 Planet Fabulous (1994)
 The Beatings Will Continue Until Morale Improves (1995)
 Alan, Elvis & God (1997)

References

External links
Something Happens entry in The Irish Punk & New Wave Discography
Something Happens on Facebook
Something Happens on Twitter

Irish rock music groups
Musical groups from Dublin (city)